The 1988 Prague Skate was held November 1988. Medals were awarded in the disciplines of men's singles, ladies' singles and pair skating.

Men

Ladies

Pairs

Ice dancing

References

Prague Skate
Prague Skate